The Borne Blanche station is a French railway station on the Paris–Lille railway line, situated on the commune of Orry-la-Ville, in the Oise, in the Hauts-de-France region. The station is on the borders of the Chantilly Forest.

It is considered as a railway halt by the SNCF, served by the RER D.

Situation 

See also 
 List of RER stations

References 

Railway stations in Oise